Paul G. Kengor (born December 6, 1966) is an author and professor of political science at Grove City College, a private Christian liberal arts college in Grove City, Pennsylvania. He is the executive director of Institute for Faith and Freedom, a Grove City College conservative think tank/policy center. He is also a visiting fellow at the Hoover Institution on War, Revolution, and Peace, a conservative think tank at Stanford University.

Kengor has focused much of his work on Ronald Reagan, faith and the presidency, conservative politics, the Cold War, the communist movement, and Catholicism.

Education
Kengor received his master's degree from the American University School of International Service and his doctorate from the University of Pittsburgh Graduate School of Public and International Affairs.

Career 
Kengor has done work for the Center for Strategic and International Studies and the conservative think tanks, the Heritage Foundation and the Allegheny Institute for Public Policy; and has served on the editorial board of Presidential Studies Quarterly. He does a regular commentary for three nationally syndicated radio programs: American Radio Journal, Moody Broadcasting, and Ave Maria Radio Network/CatholicExchange.com. He also writes for the conservative American Spectator.

Reagan, a film based upon his books about President of the United States Ronald Reagan, is set to be released in 2023.

Writings
 Wreath Layer or Policy Player?. Lexington Books, 2002. 
 The Reagan Presidency: Assessing the Man and His Legacy, with Peter Schweizer, et al. Rowman & Littlefield Publishers, 2005 
 God and Ronald Reagan: A Spiritual Life. Harper Perennial, 2005. 
 God and George W. Bush: A Spiritual Life. Harper Perennial, 2005. 
 The Crusader: Ronald Reagan and the Fall of Communism. New York: Regan Books, 2006. 
 The Judge: William P. Clark, Ronald Reagan's Top Hand. with Patricia Clark Doerner.  Ft. Collins, CO: Ignatius Press, 2007. 
 God and Hillary Clinton: A Spiritual Life. New York: Harper, 2007. 
 Dupes: How America's Adversaries Have Manipulated Progressives for a Century. Wilmington, Del: ISI Books, 2010. 
 The Communist: Frank Marshall Davis: The Untold Story of Barack Obama's Mentor. Mercury Radio Arts Publishing, 2012. 
 All The Dupes Fit To Print: Journalists Who Have Served As Tools Of Communist Propaganda, with Cliff Kincaid. CreateSpace Independent Publishing Platform, 2013. 
 11 Principles of a Reagan Conservative. Beaufort Books, 2014. 
 Reagan's Legacy in a World Transformed, with Jeffrey L. Chidester, et al. Harvard University Press, 2015. 
 Takedown: From Communists to Progressives, How the Left Has Sabotaged Family and Marriage. WND Books, 2015. 
 A Pope and A President: John Paul II, Ronald Reagan, and the Extraordinary Untold Story of the 20th Century. ISI Books, 2017.  
 The Politically Incorrect Guide to Communism. Regnery Publishing, 2017. 
 The Divine Plan: Reagan, John Paul II and the Dramatic End of the Cold War. With Robert Orlando. ISI Books, 2019. 
 The Devil and Karl Marx: Communism's Long March of Death, Deception, and Infiltration.  TAN Books, 2020.   
 The Devil and Bella Dodd: One Woman's Struggle Against Communism and Her Redemption, with Mary Nicholas.  TAN Books, 2022.

References

External links

 Simon and Schuster official author page
 Paul G. Kengor, Ph.D. page at the Center for Vision and Values
 Paul G. Kengor, Ph.D. page at the Grove City College
 

Living people
American political writers
American Roman Catholics
American male non-fiction writers
American University School of International Service alumni
Conservatism in the United States
Right-wing politics in the United States
Grove City College
University of Pittsburgh alumni
1966 births